Nicolas Jon Downie (27 May 1946 – 12 May 2021) was a British journalist and soldier.

Education and early career 
Nick Downie was educated at Haileybury and Imperial Service College, at the Middlesex Hospital and Stirling Lines. One year before his qualification as a doctor, Downie instead joined the Special Air Service as a Trooper.

Career

Military 
Downie was the only civilian of 120 applicants to the Regular SAS, but one of six who were accepted into training. Later, Downie stated that at the time he was "your original 10½-stone weakling" but that it was his "all-consuming desire" to serve in the SAS that mattered more than physical fitness during the selection process.  He was an instrumental figure in the Dhofar Rebellion, where he destroyed a South Yemen fort (with 1,050 lb of gelignite). The rebels were with Russian and Chinese support helping the infiltration of Oman by South Yemen.  Downie’s final military engagement was with the Peshmerga in Iraqi Kurdistan fighting against Saddam Hussein in 1974–75.

Journalist 
He later worked as a war correspondent, winning multiple awards. The Royal Television Society recognised his work with three awards.

Downie became disillusioned by the viewers' desire for images over analysis.

Personal life 
In 2006, Downie started a 10,000 mile journey by horseback from the Caucasus to South Africa. 

He died on 12 May 2021, from COVID-19, at the age of 74 in South Africa.

References

1946 births
2021 deaths
Deaths from the COVID-19 pandemic in South Africa
British war correspondents
British military personnel of the Dhofar Rebellion
Special Air Service soldiers